The Schell Creek Range is a linear mountain range in central White Pine County, in east-central Nevada. Most of the range is contained within the Humboldt-Toiyabe National Forest, with some of the range also included in the High Schells Wilderness.

The range comprises two major groups of peaks.  The southern section rises from a point near Burnt Peak in Lincoln County, reaching the summit of Mt. Grafton, just north of the border with White Pine County.  To the west are remote Cave Valley and the Egan Range, while to the east are U.S. Route 93 and the Fairview Range (Lincoln County).  North of Mt. Grafton, the range drops quickly to a line of lower summits, eventually reaching  Connors Pass.  That is where U.S. Route 50, the "Loneliest Highway in America", crosses the range, connecting the nearby community of Ely with the Great Basin National Park and west-central Utah.

North of Connors Pass the range continues into its higher northern section. To the west is Ely, Nevada, while to the east are Spring Valley and the high Snake Range, (including Great Basin National Park, Wheeler Peak, and Mt. Moriah). Within this section of the Schell Creek Range are Cave Lake State Park and the scenic road over Success Summit into Duck Creek Basin. Nearby are the Timber Creek and Berry Creek campgrounds (and trailheads).  

Just west of the range was the Egan Canyon Pony Express Station. From there, the range ascends to Becky Peak at  before quickly descending to the floor of Steptoe Valley near Lages Station.

Notes

References
 Peakbagger.com
 Summitpost.org (Mt. Grafton)
 Summitpost.org (North Schell Peak)

Mountain ranges of Nevada
Mountain ranges of White Pine County, Nevada
Pony Express